The 2021–22 Four Hills Tournament, part of the 2021–22 FIS Ski Jumping World Cup, took place at the four traditional venues of Oberstdorf, Garmisch-Partenkirchen, Innsbruck and Bischofshofen, located in Germany and Austria, between 28 December 2021 and 6 January 2022. It was the 70th edition of the event.

On January 3, the qualifying series was held in Innsbruck, but strong winds on January 4 made it impossible for the competition to go ahead as scheduled. The Tournament continued in Bischofshofen where the third leg was held on January 5 (both qualifiers and the competition), and the fourth leg on January 6 (again, both qualifiers and competition).

Results

Oberstdorf

 HS137 Schattenbergschanze, Germany
29 December 2021

Garmisch-Partenkirchen

 HS142 Große Olympiaschanze, Germany
1 January 2022

Bischofshofen (originally scheduled for Innsbruck)

 HS140 Paul-Ausserleitner-Schanze, Austria
5 January 2022

Bischofshofen

 HS142 Paul-Ausserleitner-Schanze, Austria
6 January 2022

Overall standings

The final standings after all four events:

References

External links 
 

2021-22
2021 in ski jumping
2022 in ski jumping
2021 in German sport
2022 in German sport
2022 in Austrian sport
December 2021 sports events in Germany
January 2022 sports events in Germany
January 2022 sports events in Austria